Mount Worthington is a  mountain summit in the Auriol Range of the Saint Elias Mountains, in Kluane National Park of Yukon, Canada. The mountain's name was officially adopted August 12, 1980, by the Geographical Names Board of Canada. Based on the Köppen climate classification, Mount Worthington is located in a subarctic climate with long, cold, snowy winters, and mild summers.

See also

List of mountains of Canada
Geography of Yukon

References

External links

 Mount Worthington: weather forecast
 Parks Canada website: Kluane

Worthington
Worthington
Worthington